Kish Khaleh may refer to:
 Kish Khaleh, Masal
 Kish Khaleh, Rezvanshahr
 Kish Khaleh, Shaft